Madox is a given name, and may refer to:
Elizabeth Madox Roberts (1881–1941), American novelist and poet
Ford Madox Brown (1821–1893), English painter
Ford Madox Ford (1873–1939), English novelist, poet, critic and editor
As a surname, it may refer to:
Richard Madox, English explorer
Thomas Madox (1666–1727), English legal antiquary and historian

It can also refer to Metal Skin Panic MADOX-01, a 1988 OVA

Unisex given names